Horokoto is a village and principal settlement (chef-lieu) of the commune of Niambia in the Cercle of Bafoulabé in the Kayes Region of south-western Mali.

References

Populated places in Kayes Region